The enzyme 2-methylcitrate dehydratase catalyzes the chemical reaction

(2S,3S)-2-hydroxybutane-1,2,3-tricarboxylate  (Z)-but-2-ene-1,2,3-tricarboxylate + H2O

This enzyme belongs to the family of lyases, specifically the hydro-lyases, which cleave carbon-oxygen bonds.  The systematic name of this enzyme class is (2S,3S)-2-hydroxybutane-1,2,3-tricarboxylate hydro-lyase [(Z)-but-2-ene-1,2,3-tricarboxylate-forming]. Other names in common use include 2-methylcitrate hydro-lyase, PrpD, and 2-hydroxybutane-1,2,3-tricarboxylate hydro-lyase.  This enzyme participates in propanoate metabolism.

Structural studies

As of late 2007, only one structure has been solved for this class of enzymes, with the PDB accession code .

References

 
 

EC 4.2.1
Enzymes of known structure